Zululand may refer to:

 Zulu Kingdom (1818–1897)
 KwaZulu, a Bantustan in South Africa (1981–1994)
 KwaZulu-Natal, a province of the Republic of South Africa
 Zululand District Municipality of KwaZulu-Natal, South Africa
 Diocese of Zululand, a diocese of the Anglican Church of Southern Africa

See also

 Amazulu (disambiguation)
 Zulu (disambiguation)